Serawaia is a monotypic genus of flowering plants in the family Fabaceae, first established in 2019. Its only species is Serawaia strobilifera, native to Borneo. The species was first described in 1994 as Callerya strobilifera.

Description
Its stems are white or very pale grey. Its leaves are evergreen and generally have 2–3 pairs of leaflets plus a terminal leaflet. Uniquely in the tribe Wisterieae, they are golden yellow in colour. They are completely free from the keel and have short basal claws. Nine of the stamens are fused together, the other is free; all curve upwards at the apex.

Taxonomy

Serawaia strobilifera was first described by Anne M. Schot in 1994 as Callerya strobilifera. A 2019 molecular phylogenetic study showed that it fell outside the clade containing the type species of Callerya, and the new genus Serawaia was established for this species. The generic name refers to the Serawai river in west Kalimantan where the species was first discovered. In the 2019 study, the genus formed a clade with Afgekia, Callerya, Kanburia and Whitfordiodendron. Its yellow flowers are one distinguishing feature.

References

Wisterieae
Monotypic Fabaceae genera